Vahur Vahtramäe (born 24 September 1976) is an Estonian football (soccer) midfielder, who currently plays for Paide Linnameeskond in the Meistriliiga, the highest division in Estonian football.

Club career
He has played for several clubs in Estonia, including JK Tallinna Kalev and JK Tulevik Viljandi.

International career
Vahtramäe earned his first official cap for the Estonia national football team on 26 October 1994, when Estonia lost 0–7 to Finland in a friendly match. He was a substitute for Mati Pari.

External links
 
 
 

1976 births
Living people
Estonian footballers
Estonia international footballers
Association football midfielders
FC Norma Tallinn players
JK Pantrid Tallinn players
FC Flora players
JK Tervis Pärnu players
Viljandi JK Tulevik players
JK Dokker Viljandi players
FC Warrior Valga players
FC Kuressaare players
FC Elva players
FC Hiiu Kalur Kärdla players
JK Tallinna Kalev players
Hyvinkään Palloseura players
Paide Linnameeskond players
Expatriate footballers in Finland
Estonian expatriate sportspeople in Finland